El Capurí is a corregimiento in Los Pozos District, Herrera Province, Panama with a population of 446 as of 2010. Its population as of 1990 was 458; its population as of 2000 was 450.

References

Corregimientos of Herrera Province